This was the first edition of the tournament.

Máximo González and Fabrício Neis won the title after defeating Marcelo Arévalo and Miguel Ángel Reyes-Varela 5–7, 6–4, [10–4] in the final.

Seeds

Draw

References
 Main Draw

Rio Tennis Classic - Doubles
2017 Doubles